Trypoxylon frigidum is a species of square-headed wasp in the family Crabronidae. It is found in North America.

Subspecies
These two subspecies belong to the species Trypoxylon frigidum:
 Trypoxylon frigidum cornutum Gussakovskij, 1932
 Trypoxylon frigidum frigidum Gussakovskij, 1932

References

Further reading

External links

 

Crabronidae